The Spencer Davis Group were a British band formed in Birmingham in 1963 by Spencer Davis (guitar), brothers Steve Winwood (vocals, keyboards) and Muff Winwood (bass guitar), and Pete York (drums). Their best known songs include the UK number ones "Somebody Help Me" and "Keep on Running" (both written by reggae musician Jackie Edwards), "I'm a Man" and "Gimme Some Lovin'", which reached #2 in the UK and #7 in the US.

Steve Winwood left in 1967 to form rock band Traffic. After releasing a few more singles, the band ceased to be active in 1969. Davis revived the group on two more occasions, without the involvement of the Winwood brothers, first in 1973–1974 for two more albums, and again from 2006, since when they had primarily been a touring act. Davis died on 19 October 2020, effectively ending the band.

History

Formation
The Spencer Davis Group was formed in 1963 in Birmingham after the Welsh guitarist Spencer Davis encountered vocalist and organist Steve Winwood (then aged 14 and still at school), and his bass playing brother Muff Winwood performing at a pub, the Golden Eagle, as the Muff Woody Jazz Band. He recruited them and Pete York on drums to form the Rhythm and Blues Quartette, which performed regularly in the city. In 1964, they signed their first recording contract after Chris Blackwell of Island Records saw them at an appearance in a local club; Blackwell also became their producer. (Island was then a small independent label with UK Fontana contracted for distribution.) Muff Winwood came up with the band's name, reasoning, "Spencer was the only one who enjoyed doing interviews, so I pointed out that if we called it the Spencer Davis Group, the rest of us could stay in bed and let him do them."

Breakthrough success
The group's first professional recording was a cover version of "Dimples". At the end of 1965 they gained their first number one single with "Keep On Running". In 1966, they followed this with "Somebody Help Me" and "When I Come Home".  They had one single issued in the US on Fontana, as well as "Keep On Running" and "Somebody Help Me" on Atco, but due to lack of promotion, none of these singles gained airplay or entered the American charts.

For the German market, the group released a medley of "Det war in Schöneberg, im Monat Mai" and "Mädel ruck ruck ruck an meine grüne Seite" (the first is from a 1913 Berlin operetta, the second is a Swabian traditional) as a tribute single for that audience, Davis having studied in West Berlin in the early 1960s.

By the end of 1966 and the beginning of 1967, the group released two more hits, "Gimme Some Lovin'" and "I'm a Man". Both of them sold over one million copies, and were awarded gold record status. These tracks proved to be their two best-known successes, especially in the U.S. (where they had signed to United Artists). Jimmy Miller was their producer.

The group starred in The Ghost Goes Gear (1966), a British musical comedy film, directed by Hugh Gladwish, and also featuring Sheila White and Nicholas Parsons. The plot involved the group in a stay at the childhood home of their manager, a haunted manor house in the English countryside. The film would later be considered a mistake by Winwood.

Disbandment

Steve Winwood left to form Traffic in 1967; his brother, Muff, moved into the music industry working in artists and repertoire (A&R) at Island Records. In the same period, both the Spencer Davis Group and Traffic featured on the soundtrack of the film Here We Go Round the Mulberry Bush released in that year. After the Winwoods' departures, the Spencer Davis Group continued with the addition of guitarist Phil Sawyer (ex-Les Fleur de Lys) and keyboardist/vocalist Eddie Hardin (ex-A Wild Uncertainty). This line-up recorded several tunes for Here We Go Round The Mulberry Bush and released the psychedelia-sounding "Time Seller" single in July 1967; the b-side, "Don't Want You No More", also received radio airplay.

This was followed by "Mr. Second-Class" in late 1967, which received heavy airplay on Radio Caroline (a pirate radio ship off the British coast), and the album With Their New Face On in 1968. At that time Ray Fenwick had replaced Phil Sawyer. The group's last minor hit, "After Tea", was released at the same time by the German band The Rattles, providing competition that led finally to a temporary stop to all activities of the band. The song was originally recorded by the Dutch group After Tea, which included guitarist/singer Fenwick among its members.

After one further single ("Short Change"), Eddie Hardin and Pete York left to form the duo Hardin & York. They were replaced by future Elton John band member Dee Murray on bass and Dave Hynes on drums. Nigel Olsson, another future Elton John band member, replaced Hynes, and this line-up produced the album Funky in 1969 (only released in the USA on Date Records, a subsidiary of CBS, in 1970) before splintering. Fenwick wrote all the songs and his 1971 solo album Keep America Beautiful, Get a Haircut also featured Murray and Olsson.

The group broke up on 19 July 1969.

Solo work and reunions
The group reunited in 1973 with Davis, Fenwick, Hardin and York, and newcomer Charlie McCracken on bass. The group released the albums Gluggo (1973) and Living in a Back Street (1974) before once again disbanding.

Davis continued working, however, producing some jazz-oriented albums in the late 1970s and early 1980s.

The band re-formed in 2006, although only Davis and Hardin remained from the 1960s group line-ups. The Spencer Davis Group continued to tour the US and Europe, but with two differing line-ups; only Spencer Davis himself was present in both formations of the band. Hardin remained with the UK version of the band until his death in 2015.

Davis died in California on 19 October 2020, at the age of 81, while being treated for pneumonia.

Cover versions of songs
The Spencer Davis Group – particularly its incarnation with Steve Winwood – proved to be influential, with many of the band's songs being recorded by other artists over the years. Among these are Chicago's cover of "I'm a Man"; The Allman Brothers Band's  version of Davis and Hardin's "Don't Want You No More" (both 1969); Three Dog Night's recording of "Can't Get Enough of It" (1970); and The Blues Brothers' "Gimme Some Lovin'" (1980). The Grateful Dead also covered Spencer Davis Group material in live performance on occasion, and Spencer Davis himself performed "I'm a Man" with the Grateful Dead in a 1989 performance at Los Angeles' Great Western Forum.

Band members
Final members

Europe
 Miller Anderson
 Colin Hodgkinson
 Steff Porzel

US
 Ed Tree
 Taras Prodaniuk
 Jim Blazer
 Tom Fillman

Former members

 Spencer Davis
 Steve Winwood
 Muff Winwood
 Pete York
 Eddie Hardin
 Phil Sawyer
 Ray Fenwick
 Dee Murray
 Dave Hynes
 Nigel Olsson
 John Hitchcock
 Charlie McCracken

Timeline

Discography

Their First LP (1965)
The Second Album (1966)
Autumn '66 (1966)
With Their New Face On (1968)
Funky (recorded 1969, released 1997)
Gluggo (1973)
Living in a Back Street (1974)

References

External links

1963 establishments in England
2020 disestablishments in England
Atco Records artists
Beat groups
British Invasion artists
British rhythm and blues boom musicians
English rock music groups
Island Records artists
Musical groups disestablished in 1969
Musical groups disestablished in 1974
Musical groups disestablished in 2020
Musical groups established in 1963
Musical groups from Birmingham, West Midlands
Musical groups reestablished in 1973
Musical groups reestablished in 2006